Jeffrey Frisch (born 1 June 1984 at Brixen, Italy) is a Canadian alpine skier.

He was expected to join the Canadian alpine skiing team at the 2010 Winter Olympics in Vancouver. However, in February 2010 prior to competition he injured his anterior cruciate ligament during training in Nakiska forcing his withdrawal from the games. Frisch lives in Mont Tremblant.

Frisch was born in Italy to an Italian father and a Canadian mother. He speaks German, Italian, English and French.

References

External links
Jeffrey Frisch at the Canadian Olympic Committee

1984 births
Living people
Canadian male alpine skiers
Italian emigrants to Canada
Anglophone Quebec people